Arthur Brooks (4 October 1891 – 8 December 1976) was an English professional footballer who played as a forward.

References

1891 births
1976 deaths
People from Waveney District
English footballers
Association football forwards
Yarmouth Town F.C. players
Gorleston F.C. players
Norwich City F.C. players
Grimsby Town F.C. players
Doncaster Rovers F.C. players
English Football League players